Maji (also spelled as Majee) is an Indian hindu family name. They originated mostly from the Indian State of West Bengal and may belong to Mahishya, Chasi Kaibartta, Jalia Kaibartta, Sahana or Ugra Kshatriya castes among Bengali Hindus.They are of Indian Origin.

See also 
 Majji
 Majhi (disambiguation)
 Sarak

References

Indian surnames
Hindu surnames
Bengali Hindu surnames